Governor Vereker may refer to:

John Vereker (civil servant) (born 1944), Governor and Commander in Chief of Bermuda from 2002 to 2007
John Vereker, 6th Viscount Gort (1886–1946), Governor of Gibraltar from 1941 to 1942 and Governor of Malta from 1942 to 1944